Jialing may refer to:

Jialing River (嘉陵江), tributary of the Yangtze River, and one of the main rivers of Sichuan
Jialing District (嘉陵区), Nanchong, Sichuan
Jialing (迦陵), pen name of poet Chia-ying Yeh
Jialing, Shanxi (贾令镇), town in Qi County, Shanxi